Jordan Ashleigh Baker (born 1 November 1996) is an Australian soccer player, who last played for Western Sydney Wanderers in the Australian W-League.

Playing career

Soccer

Baker played youth football with Gymea United FC and Sutherland Shire FA from 2007 to 2011.

Baker played for Western Sydney Wanderers in the 2013–14 W-League and re-signed with the Wanderers for the 2014–15 W-League season.

Baker represented the Australia Schoolgirls and Australian under-20 teams.

Baker again was selected in the Wanderers squad for the 2015–16 W-League.

Rugby league
In 2017, Baker began playing rugby league, where she represented Cronulla-Sutherland Sharks in the NSWRL Women's Premiership. She was one of the competitions top-scorers in 2018.

References

External links

1996 births
Living people
Australian women's soccer players
Western Sydney Wanderers FC (A-League Women) players
A-League Women players
People from Paddington
Women's association football forwards
Australian female rugby league players